Tűzoltó utca 25. is a 1973 Hungarian film directed by István Szabó. It won the Golden Leopard at the 1974 Locarno International Film Festival

Reception
It won  the Golden Leopard at the 1974 Locarno International Film Festival.

References

External links

1973 films
Films directed by István Szabó
Golden Leopard winners
Hungarian historical drama films
Films set in Budapest